Tre Tucker (born March 8, 2001) is an American football wide receiver for the Cincinnati Bearcats.

High school career 
Tucker attended Cuyahoga Valley Christian Academy in Cuyahoga Falls, Ohio. Tucker finished his high school career recording 2,288 rushing yards, 1,854 receiving yards, and 68 total touchdowns. A three star recruit, he committed to play college football at the University of Cincinnati.

College career 
In Tucker's freshman season, he tallied seven receptions for 92 yards.

The following season, Tucker would score his first career touchdown against Austin Peay. Tucker ended the season with three receiving touchdowns, while being named to the Second-team All-AAC as a kick returner.

As a junior, Tucker caught 34 passes, for 426 yards, and two touchdowns.

In Tucker's final season, he recorded 52 receptions, 672 yards, and three touchdowns. He would forgo playing in the 2022 Fenway Bowl and declared for the 2023 NFL Draft. Tucker finished his collegiate career with 111 receptions for 1,426 yards, and eight touchdowns.

References

External links 

 Cincinnati Bearcats bio

Living people
Cincinnati Bearcats football players
Players of American football from Akron, Ohio
American football wide receivers
Year of birth missing (living people)